Aylin Vatankoş (born 1970 in Izmir, Turkey) is a Turkish singer. She studied music at Istanbul Technical University Turkish Music State Conservatory.

She represented Turkey in Eurovision Song Contest 1992 with the song "Yaz Bitti" ("Summer is over" in Turkish). The event was held in Malmö, Sweden with Vatankoş winning 17 points and finished 19th out of 23 contestants.

Vatankoş continued her music career, releasing two albums: Çözemedim (1995) and Yeniden (2010).

References

Turkish women singers
Eurovision Song Contest entrants of 1992
Eurovision Song Contest entrants for Turkey
1970 births
Living people
Musicians from İzmir